A gap is a geological formation that is a low point or opening between hills or mountains or in a ridge or mountain range.  It may be called a col, notch, pass, saddle, water gap, or wind gap, and geomorphologically is most often carved by water erosion from a freshet, stream or a river. Gaps created by freshets are often, if not normally, devoid of water through much of the year, their streams being dependent upon the meltwaters of a snow pack. Gaps sourced by small springs will generally have a small stream excepting perhaps during the most arid parts of the year.

Water gaps of necessity often cut entirely through a barrier range and riverine gaps may create canyons such as the riverine gaps of the Danube River, Lehigh River Gorge, the Colorado River's Grand Canyon and the Genesee River. Such cuttings may expose millennia of strata in the local rock column writing the geologic record.

References

Landforms